Last Glacial Maximum refugia were places (refugia) in which humans and other species survived during the Last Glacial Period in the Northern Hemisphere, around 25,000 to 20,000 years ago.

Sub-Saharan Africa and Australia were not affected by the glaciation, although vast areas of those continents were too dry for human habitation of any sort, even by the most specialised and well-adapted foragers. New Zealand had no humans at the time. Some recent archaeological evidence suggests the possibility that human arrival in the Americas may have occurred prior to the Last Glacial Maximum more than 20,000 years ago, including possibly areas adjacent to ice sheets, but research is still in an early stage.
The best attested shelters are therefore mainly those in Eurasia. Several of them have been studied.

Europe
Solutrean
Gravettian
Pavlovian culture
Franco-Cantabrian region
Würm glaciation

North Africa
Ibero-Maurusian
Capsian culture

Asia
Kebaran culture
Japan, Jōmon period

See also
Glacial relict
Magdalenian
Upper Paleolithic
Eurasiatic languages

References

Ice ages
Prehistoric Africa
Prehistoric Asia
Prehistoric Europe

fi:Viime jääkauden huippukauden refugio